According to traditional Chinese uranography, the modern constellation Pyxis is located within the southern quadrant of the sky, which is symbolized as the Vermilion Bird of the South (南方朱雀, Nán Fāng Zhū Què).

The name of the western constellation in modern Chinese is 羅盤座 (luó pán zuò), meaning "the compass  constellation".

Stars
The map of Chinese constellation in constellation Pyxis area consists of:

See also
Chinese astronomy
Traditional Chinese star names
Chinese constellations

References

External links
Pyxis – Chinese associations

Astronomy in China
Pyxis (constellation)